Armando Joseph Catalano (January 14, 1924 – April 30, 1989), better known as Guy Williams, was an American actor. He played swashbuckling action heroes in the 1950s and 1960s.

Among his most notable achievements were two TV series: Zorro in the title role, and as the father of the Robinson family on the popular sci-fi series Lost in Space.

During most of the 1970s, Guy Williams frequently visited and worked in television shows in Argentina, where he was most revered. He retired in the early 1980s in Buenos Aires, where he died of a brain aneurysm in 1989.

Biography

Early life
Guy Williams was born of Sicilian parentage on January 14, 1924, as Armando Joseph Catalano in the Washington Heights area of New York City. His parents, insurance broker Attilio Catalano and Clara Arcara, were from the island of Sicily, and were by then living in poverty. Attilio was the son of a wealthy timber grower in Messina, who purchased land in New Jersey. Williams grew up in the Little Italy neighborhood of The Bronx.

In Public School 189, Williams stood out in mathematics. Later, he attended George Washington High School, while he occasionally worked at a soda fountain. He then left to attend the Peekskill Military Academy, where he was an enthusiastic student. His interests included American football and chess.

First artistic steps
Williams wanted to be an actor, spurred by his good looks and 6'3" height. When he decided not to continue studying, his mother, who later became an executive of a foreign film company, was disappointed because it was expected that he would follow in his father's footsteps as an insurance broker.

After working as a welder, cost accountant and aircraft-parts inspector during World War II, Williams became a salesman in the luggage department at Wanamaker's. While there, he decided to send his photos to a modeling agency. He quickly found great success with assignments resulting in photographs in newspapers and magazines, including Harper's Bazaar as well as on billboards and book covers. He then adopted the name Guy Williams (1940s) on the advice of his agent Henry Wilson after a director refused to cast him because of his on-screen moniker, Guido Armando, that sounded "too foreign".

In 1946, he signed a single-year contract offered by MGM and moved to Hollywood. Williams had a featured role as a pilot in the film The Beginning or the End (1947), about the first U.S. deployed atom bomb. He appeared in only a few films and soon moved back to New York.

In 1948, to advertise cigarettes while skiing, Williams did an extensive filming trip accompanied by Janice Cooper, a John Robert Powers model. During the long photographic sessions, they fell in love, marrying on December 8, just after they returned to New York City. They had two children, Guy Steven Catalano (aka Guy Williams Jr.) and Antoinette Catalano (aka Toni Williams); both became actors.

By 1950, Williams was filming some of the pioneering television commercials in the U.S. His father died in 1951, never to witness his son's rise to fame. In 1952, Williams obtained a new one-year contract with Universal-International and moved to Hollywood. He also appeared in an episode of the Lone Ranger, playing town sheriff.

Early Hollywood (1951–1957)
Guy Williams appeared in small supporting roles in films, including:
 The Day the Earth Stood Still (1951) (uncredited) as Radar Operator at beginning of film
 Bonzo Goes to College (1952) – as Ronald Calkins
 The Mississippi Gambler (1953) – as Andre
 The Golden Blade (1953) – as Baghdad's town crier
 The Man from the Alamo (1953) – as a sergeant
 Take Me to Town (1953) – as a small hero
 Highway Patrol (1955) - as Patrolman Hanson
 I Was a Teenage Werewolf (1957) – as police officer

In 1953, he suffered a serious accident when he fell from a horse and was dragged over 200 yards, resulting in a long scar on his left shoulder. Because of this he returned to New York to continue acting and modeling there and temporarily abandoned his film career. In 1953, he left Universal and became a freelancer for movies produced by Allied Artists and Warner Brothers.

Zorro (1957–1959, 1960–1961)

Early in 1957, Williams appeared twice in the role of Steve Clay in the television series Men of Annapolis, a military drama set at the United States Naval Academy. He also appeared in the Rod Cameron drama State Trooper in the episode "No Fancy Cowboys" about the defrauding of guests at a dude ranch.

About this time, the Walt Disney Company was casting for Zorro, a television series based on the character created in 1919 by Johnston McCulley: the young nobleman Don Diego de la Vega and his masked alter ego Zorro. To play the main character, the chosen actor would have to be handsome and have some experience with fencing. Walt Disney interviewed Guy Williams, telling him to start growing a mustache "neither very long or thick." The exclusive contract paid Williams the then very high wage of $2,500 per week, equal to $ today. Williams resumed his professional training in fencing with the Belgian champion Fred Cavens (who also trained Douglas Fairbanks, Errol Flynn and Tyrone Power), since the show required sword fights in most episodes. He also took guitar lessons with the famous Vicente Gomez. Williams's first appearance as Zorro was on the Disney anthology television series The Fourth Anniversary Show, wherein he challenged the notion that Zorro was a fictional character.

The series of half-hour episodes debuted on ABC on October 10, 1957. It was an instant hit in the U.S. Seventy-eight episodes were produced over two seasons (1957–1959), and two movies were edited from TV episodes: The Sign of Zorro (1958) and Zorro the Avenger (1959). The theme song was composed by Norman Foster and George Bruns and performed by The Mellomen; it reached #17 on the Hit Parade. In 1959, a legal dispute arose between Disney and ABC, causing a hiatus and the eventual cancellation of Zorro. However, four hour-long episodes were produced with the original primary cast, including Williams. These episodes were released as part of the Walt Disney Presents series between October 30, 1960, and April 12, 1961.

On March 5, 1959, as Zorro was ending its original run, Williams was a guest star, along with Sally Brophy and Tom Nolan on  The Ford Show, Starring Tennessee Ernie Ford.

In 1962, Williams played Sir Miles Hendon in the Walt Disney's The Prince and the Pauper, shot in England.

European films
After finishing his contract with Disney, Guy Williams went to Europe to film two movies:
 Damon and Pythias (MGM production filmed in Italy in 1962, directed by Curtis Bernhardt), as Damon, the classic Greek hero who offers his life as warrant of the word of Pythias (played by Don Burnett), his friend who has been condemned to death for political reasons;
 Captain Sindbad (MGM production filmed in Germany in 1962, directed by Byron Haskin, based on the classic tale of the Arabian Nights), in the role of Sindbad the Sailor.

Bonanza (1964)
In 1964, Guy Williams returned to Hollywood to resume his career, being added to the cast of the hit TV series Bonanza as Ben's nephew Will Cartwright. Williams found himself written out of the series after five episodes despite being slated to become one of the four permanent leads. His character had been created as a replacement for Adam Cartwright, since actor Pernell Roberts planned to leave the show at the end of that season, thus allowing the format with four regular leads to continue. Fans wrote in to keep the original Cartwrights and producers held Roberts to his contract and kept him on for another season. It is unknown as to how those fans got the address.

Lost in Space (1965–1968)

In 1965, Guy Williams returned to weekly television in the popular science-fiction series Lost in Space with June Lockhart as his wife.

Guy Williams played Professor John Robinson, an expert in astrophysics and geology, who commanded the mission of the Jupiter 2 spaceship, taking his family in a voyage to colonize the Alpha Centauri star system.

Retirement in Argentina (1979–1989)

After Lost in Space, Guy Williams decided to retire in order to better enjoy his wealth which had been generated by investments in several businesses, buying and selling on the stock market.

When Williams had first visited Argentina in 1973, he was taken by the admiration and fascination the Argentine people expressed for him and his character of El Zorro. In return, Williams fell in love with the culture and people of Argentina. In the late 1970s, he retired, except for personal appearances, to Recoleta, an upscale neighborhood of Buenos Aires.

In subsequent years, Williams also brought to Argentina some of the original cast members of the Zorro series, including Henry Calvin who performed as Sergeant Garcia. Williams even formed a circus (Circo Real Madrid) with the local fencing champion -and later actor- Fernando Lupiz, traveling all over South America (1977).

In 1983, Williams returned to Los Angeles for two final television appearances. He joined Lost in Space cast members June Lockhart, Angela Cartwright, Bob May and Marta Kristen for two celebrity episodes of Family Feud against the casts of Batman and Gilligan's Island respectively. He later appeared as a guest on Good Morning America.

Death
In 1989, after spending solitary months in Argentina, it was reported that Williams had disappeared. The local police searched his apartment in Recoleta on May 6, 1989, finding his body. He had died of a brain aneurysm. Owing to his great popularity in Argentina, his ashes lay for two years at the Argentine Actors' Society cemetery at La Chacarita Cemetery, Actor Pantheon & Crypt 278. In 1991, in accordance with his wishes, Williams's ashes were spread over the Pacific Ocean in Malibu, California.

Homages

 In 2000, Williams was the first local celebrity inducted into the Bronx Walk of Fame. He was represented at the ceremony by his son Steven Catalano (Guy Williams Jr.)
 In 2001, (August 2), he was posthumously granted a star on the Hollywood Walk of Fame, at 7080 Hollywood Blvd after petitions from thousands of his fans in front of the Hollywood Chamber of Commerce in 2000.
 In October 2002, the fans of Williams, with his children Steven and Toni in attendance, dedicated to him a bench in New York's Central Park.
 In August 2003, fans belonging to an online group Guy Williams' Friendslist, along with Williams's wife Janice, their children Steven and Toni, and Toni's son Nando in attendance, placed a commemorative plaque dedicated to Williams in the Old Cemetery section of the Mission San Luis Rey de Francia at Oceanside, California, where the Zorro series was filmed in 1957. 
 In 2011, Williams was named a Disney Legend.
 The impression of a U.S. postage stamp commemorative of Guy Williams was cancelled due to the change of the US Postal Service's protocol, though the fans had been campaigning for the stamp since 1998.

A number of books have been written which feature Williams, particularly in his role as Zorro. This includes the Zorro Television Companion, detailing the making of the Disney series, as well as a biography by Antoinette Girgenti Lane, Guy Williams: The Man Behind the Mask (2005).

A collection of original Zorro short stories, some inspired specifically by Guy Williams, was edited by Richard Dean Starr and released in 2008. It includes an introduction by Guy Williams Jr. (with Matthew Baugh) and an afterword by Isabel Allende. The cover art on the trade paperback edition by Douglas Klauba was a homage to Guy Williams.

References

External links
 
 Official Guy Williams Family Page

1924 births
1989 deaths
American male film actors
American male television actors
George Washington Educational Campus alumni
Male models from New York (state)
American people of Italian descent
Male actors from New York (state)
American emigrants to Argentina
American expatriates in Argentina
20th-century American male actors
Deaths from intracranial aneurysm
Masked actors
Models from New York City
Peekskill Military Academy alumni